The 2014–15 South Carolina State Bulldogs basketball team represented South Carolina State University during the 2014–15 NCAA Division I men's basketball season. The Bulldogs, led by second year head coach Murray Garvin, played their home games at the SHM Memorial Center and were members of the Mid-Eastern Athletic Conference. They finished the season 11–22, 7–9 in MEAC play to finish in a tie for seventh place. They advanced to the quarterfinals of the MEAC tournament where they lost to Norfolk State.

Roster

Schedule

|-
!colspan=9 style="background:#960018; color:#00008B;"| Regular season

|-
!colspan=9 style="background:#960018; color:#00008B;"| MEAC tournament

References

South Carolina State Bulldogs basketball seasons
South Carolina State